Klip may refer to:

 KLIP, a radio station licensed to Monroe, Louisiana, United States
 "Klip" (song), a 2016 song by Jimilian
 Klip River, Gauteng, South Africa
 Klip River (KwaZulu-Natal), South Africa
 A file format and product used by the Klipfolio dashboard
 Clip (film), a 2012 Serbian film

See also
 
 Clip (disambiguation)